Karen Lewis Young (born June 21, 1951) is an American politician who has served in the Maryland Senate from district 3 since 2023. She previously served as a member of the Maryland House of Delegates from district 3A from 2015 to 2023.

Early life and career
Young was born in The Bronx on June 21, 1951 and was raised in Montoursville, Pennsylvania. She attended Franklin and Marshall College, where she earned a B.A. degree in history in 1973, and Columbia University, where she earned a M.B.A. degree in American history in 1974 and in marketing in 1977. She worked at a variety of financial firms, including Citibank, Capital One, Chase Manhattan, and American Express, from 1996 to 2008 and operated her own consulting business, Karen Lewis Market Research, from 2004 to 2006.

Young moved to the town of Frederick, Maryland in 1996 to do direct marketing for Farmers and Mechanics National Bank.

In May 2009, Young announced that she would run for a seat on the Frederick Board of Aldermen, motivated by the 2008 United States presidential election and her community involvement. She earned 14.34 percent of the vote in the Democratic primaries and 11.57 percent of the vote in the general election.

In 2013, Young unsuccessfully ran for mayor of Frederick, Maryland, earning 31.10 percent of the vote in the general election.

In February 2014, Young filed to run for delegate, seeking to succeed delegate Galen R. Clagett, who was retiring that year. She received 34.5 percent of the vote in the Democratic primary election and 26.3 percent of the vote in the general election.

In the legislature
Young was sworn into the Maryland House of Delegates on January 14, 2015.

In June 2021, Young announced that she would run for Maryland Senate in 2022, seeking to succeed her husband, senator Ronald Young. In November 2021, he announced that he would retire at the end of his term in 2022 and endorsed his wife's campaign to succeed him.

Electoral history

References

External links
 

1951 births
Living people
Democratic Party members of the Maryland House of Delegates
21st-century American politicians
21st-century American women politicians
Politicians from the Bronx
Women state legislators in Maryland
Maryland city council members
Women city councillors in Maryland
Democratic Party Maryland state senators